Edmund Lawrence may refer to:
Edmund Wickham Lawrence (born 1932), governor-general of Saint Kitts and Nevis
Edmund Lawrence (basketball) (1952–2015), basketball center
Edmund Lawrence (MP), 14th-century English member of Parliament for Lancashire
Edmund Lawrence (director) of Married in Name Only